"Vaar" is a song written and sung by singer Sidhu Moose Wala. The song was released on YouTube on Guru Nanak Gurpurab of 2022 as a posthumous single as a tribute to the slain Sikh General who is credited to be the only person in modern history to conquer, divide and consolidate the heart of the Pashtuns, the Khyber Pass and the Afghan capital; Hari Singh Nalwa.

Commercial Performance

Charts

Credits and Personnel 

 Sidhu Moose Wala – songwriting
 Snappy – production
 Rass – mixing and engineering
 Navkaran Brar – artwork

References 

Sidhu Moose Wala songs
2022 songs